= Impossible Nothing =

- Also known as: Darwin Frost
- Origin: New York City, New York, US
- Genres: Instrumental hip hop, glitch
- Years active: 2010–present

Impossible Nothing is an instrumental hip hop and glitch music project. It was founded by composer Darwin Frost in 2010 to serve as an outlet for his work outside of his band Skookum Sound System. Frost has used the term "Maximalism" to describe his unique approach to music production and sound collage composition. Following this concept, Impossible Nothing has issued a forty-minute single, as well as fifteen four-hour and twenty-minute albums overall: Phonemenomicon in 2016; Lexemenomicon, Tonemenomicon, Taxemenomicon and Glossemenomicon in 2017; Chronemenomicon, Phrasemenomicon, Graphemenomicon and Visemenomicon in 2018; Morphemenomicon, Mnemenomicon, Noemenomicon and Numerinomicon in 2019; Tzadik in 2021; and Hypokeimenomicon and Mythemenomicon in 2022.

== History ==
Darwin Frost was originally a member of Skookum Sound System, a hip hop audio-visual collective. In 2010 he began uploading his music on the Bandcamp music streaming platform under the moniker Impossible Nothing. After a series of early releases he issued Mechadoom, an album comprised reworkings of compositions by hip hop producer MF Doom, on 28 October 2014. Shortly afterward, Frost cleared his Bandcamp page to make way for a new ambitious project.

On 11 May 2016, Impossible Nothing released its first official full-length studio album titled Phonemenomicon. The album comprised twenty-six tracks - each ten minutes long - adding up to a nearly four and a half hour run-time. It proved successful with music critics and made PopMatters' best mixtape picks of 2016. Following in the vein of his first release, he released a second, third, fourth and fifth album in 2017 that featured the same number of tracks and run-time, titled Lexemenomicon, Tonemenomicon, Taxemenomicon and Glossemenomicon respectively. 2018 saw the release of Impossible Nothing's sixth, seventh, eighth and ninth albums, titled Chronemenomicon, Phrasemenomicon, Graphemenomicon and Visemenomicon respectively. The concept project of the multiple four and a half hour albums was briefly halted in 2019, with the releases of the tenth, eleventh, twelfth and thirteenth albums Morphemenomicon, Mnemenomicon, Noemenomicon and Numerinomicon, before two more albums were released in 2022, titled Hypokeimenomicon and Mythemenomicon. Total runtime for all of the ten minute long tracks combined is around sixty nine hours.

== Discography ==
Studio albums

- Phonemenomicon (2016)
- Lexemenomicon (2017)
- Tonemenomicon (2017)
- Taxemenomicon (2017)
- Glossemenomicon (2017)
- Chronemenomicon (2018)
- Phrasemenomicon (2018)
- Graphemenomicon (2018)
- Visemenomicon (2018)
- Morphemenomicon (2019)
- Mnemenomicon (2019)
- Noemenomicon (2019)
- Numerinomicon (2019)
- She is Black (2020)
- Born X (2020)
- Music To Drive By (2020)
- Tzadik (2021)
- Zoopak (2021)
- Hypokeimenomicon (2022)
- Mythemenomicon (2022)
